Albert Lansdown (10 March 1897 – 7 January 1979) was an Australian cricketer. He played eight first-class cricket matches for Victoria between 1923 and 1930.

See also
 List of Victoria first-class cricketers

References

External links
 

1897 births
1979 deaths
Australian cricketers
Victoria cricketers
Cricketers from Melbourne